The 1904 Cornell Big Red football team was an American football team that represented Cornell University during the 1904 college football season.  In their third, non-consecutive season under head coach Pop Warner, the Big Red compiled a 7–3 record and outscored all opponents by a combined total of 226 to 92.

Schedule

References

Cornell
Cornell Big Red football seasons
Cornell Big Red football